Urobatis is a genus of the family Urotrygonidae. These rays live in Costa Rica, Mexico, the Bahamas, El Salvador, Honduras, Guatemala, Nicaragua, Colombia, Venezuela, Panama, Trinidad and Tobago, Barbados, Grenada, Saint Vincent and the Grenadines, Saint Lucia, Martinique, Dominica, Guadeloupe, Montserrat, Antigua and Barbuda, Belize, Puerto Rico, Saint Kitts and Nevis, Anguilla, Dominican Republic, Haiti, Jamaica, Cuba, Cayman Islands, Virgin Islands, Turks and Caicos Islands, French Guiana, Guyana, Suriname, Chile, Peru, Ecuador and the United States.

Species
There are currently seven recognized species in this genus:
 Urobatis concentricus R. C. Osburn & J. T. Nichols, 1916 (Bullseye round stingray)
 Urobatis halleri J. G. Cooper, 1863 (Round stingray) 
 Urobatis jamaicensis G. Cuvier, 1816 (Yellow stingray)
 Urobatis maculatus Garman, 1913 (Spotted round ray) 
 Urobatis marmoratus Philippi {Krumweide}, 1893 (Chilean round stingray)
 †Urobatis molleni Hovestadt & Hovestadt-Euler, 2010
 Urobatis pardalis Del-Moral-Flores, Angulo, M. I. Bussing & W. A. Bussing, 2015 (Leopard round stingray) 
 †Urobatis sloani Blainville, 1816
 Urobatis tumbesensis Chirichigno F. & McEachran, 1979 (Tumbes round stingray)

References

 
Urotrygonidae
Ray genera
Taxa named by Samuel Garman
Taxonomy articles created by Polbot